Wöhrder Wiese station is a Nuremberg U-Bahn station, located on the U2 and U3

References

Nuremberg U-Bahn stations
Railway stations in Germany opened in 1990
Buildings and structures completed in 1990